The 2021–22 winter transfer window for Iranian football transfers opened on 16 January and closed at midnight on 12 February. Additionally, players without a club could join at any time. This list includes transfers featuring at least one Iran Football League club which were completed after the end of the summer 2021 transfer window on 7 November 2021 and before the end of the 2021–22 winter window.

Persian Gulf Pro League

Aluminium

In:

Out:

Esteghlal

In:

Out:

Fajr Sepasi

In:

Out:

Foolad

In:

Out:

Gol Gohar

In:

Out:

Havadar

In:

Out:

Mes Rafsanjan

In:

Out:

Naft Masjed-Soleyman

In:

Out:

Nassaji

In:

Out:

Padideh

In:

Out:

Paykan

In:

Out:

Persepolis

In:

Out:

Sanat Naft

In:

Out:

Sepahan

In:

Out:

Tractor

In:

Out:

Zob Ahan

In:

Out:

Notes and references

Football transfers winter 2021–22
2021-22
Transfers